David Brown (born July 11, 1994) is a professional Canadian football offensive lineman for the Montreal Alouettes of the Canadian Football League (CFL).

University career
Brown played U Sports football for the Western Mustangs from 2014 to 2018. He was a member of the 53rd Vanier Cup championship team in 2017 and a U Sports First Team All-Canadian in 2017 and 2018.

Professional career

Calgary Stampeders
Brown was drafted in the fourth round, 28th overall, by the Calgary Stampeders in the 2018 CFL Draft and signed with the team on May 14, 2018. He attended training camp with the team in 2018 but did not participate in the preseason due to a previous injury. Brown was suspended and then released so that he could complete his final year of U Sports eligibility. He re-joined the Stampeders after the conclusion of the 2018 season as it was announced by the team on December 21, 2018.

In the 2019 season, Brown began the year on the practice roster, but dressed in his first professional game on July 18, 2019, against the Toronto Argonauts. He dressed for five regular season games in 2019. He did not play in 2020 due to the cancellation of the 2020 CFL season. As a pending free agent, Brown was released on January 13, 2021.

Montreal Alouettes
On June 9, 2021, it was announced that Brown had signed with the Montreal Alouettes. Following training camp, he made the team's active roster as a backup. He started his first game on October 11, 2021, in the Thanksgiving Day Classic against the Ottawa Redblacks. Brown played in 10 regular season games, starting in three, before being placed on the injured list for the final four games of 2021. He returned for the East Semi-Final playoff game, but the Alouettes lost to the Hamilton Tiger-Cats. He signed a contract extension on December 17, 2021.

References

External links
 Montreal Alouettes bio

1994 births
Living people
Calgary Stampeders players
Canadian football offensive linemen
Montreal Alouettes players
Players of Canadian football from Ontario
Sportspeople from London, Ontario
Western Mustangs football players